The Jabiluka dwarf skink (Menetia concinna) is a species of skink found in Northern Territory in Australia.

References

Menetia
Reptiles described in 1984
Skinks of Australia
Endemic fauna of Australia
Taxa named by Ross Allen Sadlier